Correa lawrenceana var. rosea is a variety of Correa lawrenceana that is endemic to the Snowy Mountains of New South Wales. It is a shrub with narrow elliptical leaves and narrow cylindrical flowers that are pink or dull red with green lobes and covered with small, compact star-shaped hairs.

Description

Taxonomy
The variety was first formally described in 1961 by Paul Wilson in the  journal Nuytsia, from specimens collected by Joyce Vickery near the Geehi River in 1958.

Distribution and habitat
This correa grows in forest in the Snowy Mountains of New South Wales.

References

lawrenciana rosea
Flora of New South Wales
Taxa named by Paul G. Wilson
Plants described in 1961